Roerichiora is a genus of moths in the family Cossidae.

Species
 Roerichiora bachma Yakovlev, 2011 
 Roerichiora clara (Bryk, 1950)
 Roerichiora obliquifascia (Bryk, 1950)
 Roerichiora stigmatica (Moore, 1879)

References

 , 2009: The Carpenter Moths (Lepidoptera:Cossidae) of Vietnam. Entomofauna Supplement 16: 11-32.

External links
Natural History Museum Lepidoptera generic names catalog

Zeuzerinae